Jēkabs Bīne (11 April 1895 – 24 October 1955) was a Latvian painter, stained glass artist, teacher and art critic.

Biography 
Jēkabs Bīne was born in Riga in 1895 in merchant family. He studied at the Riga City Art School (1913–1915), Kharkov Art School (1915–1918) and the Art Academy of Latvia (1921–1926). His graduation work from Jānis Tilbergs' figurative painting class at the Art Academy was the painting Resurrection.

His first solo exhibition was held in 1917. In the 1920s he painted Christian subjects, including the altarpieces for the churches in Cesvaine (1924),  (1926) and Vecsaule (1927). His focus on sacral painting developed into an interest in Latvian mythology, idealism and an ambition to connect art to folk culture and nature. He studied the symbols of Latvian ornamentation and incorporated this in his art. He became involved in Ernests Brastiņš' neopagan movement Dievturība and became one of its main public promoters.

From 1940 and throughout the Stalinist era, this was repressed as "bourgeois art". Bīne's diaries show that he was disappointed with the direction the Soviet authorities set out for the arts, and that he viewed it as vulgarization. He did however adapt to the new regime. As part of his acceptance of a position as a stained glass specialist in 1951, he wrote a 1952 paper titled Ornament in which he condemned his previous views on Latvian ornamentation.

Bīne was the father of the actress  (1928–2006). He died in Riga on 24 October 1955.

Legacy 
Bīne's 1931 painting Dievs, Māra, Laima, depicting three gods from Latvian mythology, remains one of the most prominent examples of Dievturi iconography. A book about Bīne by the art historian Agita Gritāne was published in 2020. The same year, an exhibition of his works was held in Kuldīga to commemorate the 125th anniversary of his birth.

References

Further reading 
 

1895 births
1955 deaths
Artists from Riga
People from Kreis Riga
Latvian modern pagans
Latvian art critics
20th-century Latvian painters
Modern pagan artists
Latvian stained glass artists and manufacturers
Latvian educational theorists